Tahir Emra (born 1938) is an Albanian painter. He is a member of the Academy of Sciences and Arts of Kosovo.

Biography
Tahir Emra was born on March 10, 1938, in Gjakova, Kingdom of Yugoslavia. He attended the School of Arts of Peć. In 1966 he graduated from the Academy of Figurative Arts of Belgrade. He was a founding member Academy of Figurative Arts of Kosovo in 1974. He is considered one of the proponents of contemporary art in Kosovo in the 1960s.

His works were exhibited throughout Yugoslavia in the 1970s and the 1980s. He is a member of the Academy of Sciences and Arts of Kosovo. In 2013, a monograph was published by the Academy on the occasion of Emra's 75th birthday.

References 

Albanian painters
1938 births
Living people
Kosovan painters
Artists from Gjakova
Members of the Academy of Sciences and Arts of Kosovo